DBSA may refer to:
Development Bank of Southern Africa
Depression and Bipolar Support Alliance
De Beers Societe Anonyme
Dodecylbenzenesulfonic acid